Sven Becker (born 14 February 1968, Wiesbaden, Germany) is a German gynaecologist, gynaecologic surgeon, and oncologist.

Life and work 
From 1987 to 1994, Becker studied at the Johannes-Gutenberg University of Mainz. From 1989 to 1990, he studied at Université René Descartes Paris. In 1991, he studied for one semester at the Autonomous University of Madrid. From 1992 to 1993, he studied for two semesters at the Nihon University in Tokyo. In 1994, in addition to the Third Medical State Exam, he also completed the US State Exam. In 1999, at the Johannes-Gutenberg University of Mainz, he was awarded the title Doctor of Medicine (magna cum laude) for his thesis entitled “In vitro testing of potential antiviral agents against HIV in the MTT assay”, which he wrote under the direction of Werner E. G. Müller at the Institute for Physiological Chemistry. In 2006, he completed his habilitation at the University Women's Hospital of Tübingen with his work entitled “Tumour cell dissemination and tumour cell persistence in breast cancer - the effect of systemic treatment and characteristics of cells”, which he wrote under the supervision of Diethelm Wallwiener.

In 1995, Becker started his medical activity at the Academic Teaching Hospital of the University of Frankfurt am Main under the direction of Gerd Hoffmann. He then worked in the Women's Hospital of the St Joseph Hospital in Wiesbaden and then under the direction of Heinz Höfler at the Institute for Pathology at the Technical University of Munich in the Rechts der Isar Hospital. From 1997 to 2001, Becker completed training as a gynaecologist and obstetrician at the Johns Hopkins Hospital of the Johns Hopkins University in Baltimore. In 2001, he passed the exam as American Specialist Gynaecology and Obstetrics (ACOG). In the same year, he returned to Germany, where he acquired German recognition as a Specialist for Gynaecology and Obstetrics . From 2002 to 2004, he was Head of Clinical Obstetrics at the University Women's Hospital in Tübingen. Subsequent positions included: Operative Consultant, Head of Operative Gynaecology, Consultant for Gynaecology, and Consultant at the University Women's Hospital of Tübingen (from 2008). As part of his work in Tübingen, Becker qualified in the areas “Special Obstetrics and Perinatal Medicine” (2006), “Special Operative Gynaecology and Gynaecologic Oncology” (2008), and “Palliative Medicine” (2010).

On 1 April 2012, Becker took over from Klaus Diedrich as W3 Professor for Obstetrics and Gynaecology at the University of Lübeck and Director of the Hospital for Obstetrics and Gynaecology the Lübeck Campus of the University Hospital Schleswig-Holstein. Since 1 July 2012, he has been Professor (W3) and Director of the Women's Hospital at the Goethe University of Frankfurt (am Main).

Sven Becker is married with two children.

Research topics and clinical focus 
The clinical focuses of Sven Becker include operative gynaecology, gynecologic oncology, and minimally invasive surgery (laparoscopy). The treatment encompasses ovarian cancer, cervical cancer, uterine cancer, vulvar cancers, vaginal carcinomas, fertility-maintaining therapy of malignant diseases and the treatment of sarcomas of the genital area.

Research topics include special and innovative surgical techniques in these areas, micrometastasis in oncology, and the understanding of treatment-relevant molecular biological changes in the cancer cell, especially in breast cancer, ovarian cancer, and other gynaecological tumours.

Publications 
Together with Diethelm Wallwiener, Becker is the author of the 4th edition of the Atlas of Gynecologic Surgery. He is author and co-author of numerous scientific works, which can be found on PubMed.

Memberships 
Sven Becker is a member of the following German and international societies:
 German Society of Obstetrics and Gynaecology (DGGG)
 Professional Association of Gynaecologists (BVF)
 German Cancer Society (DKG)
 German Senological Society (DSG)
 American College of Gynaecology and Obstetrics (ACOG)
 Gynaecological Oncology Working Group (AGO)
 Gynaecologic Endoscopy Working Group (AGE)
 German Society for Perinatal Medicine      (DGPM)
 European Society for Obstetrics/Gynaecology; German/French language
 German Society for Ultrasound in Medicine (DEGUM)
 European Society of Gynaecological Oncology (ESGO)
 European Society of Gynaecologic Endoscopy (ESGE)

Links

References 

Living people
German oncologists
German gynaecologists
1968 births
People from Wiesbaden